Pleiomeris is a genus of plants in the family Primulaceae. It contains the following species (but this list may be incomplete):

 Pleiomeris canariensis (Willd.) A.DC.

Primulaceae
Primulaceae genera
Taxonomy articles created by Polbot